Olga Safari (born May 1, 1993) is an American actress of Iranian background, Internet personality, and model. She appeared as Briefcase Model #14 on the 2018 CNBC re-boot season of Deal or No Deal.

Career 
Safari started her modeling and acting career at the age of 19 in commercials for ULTA, Nissan, Levi’s, Toyota, UNIQLO, and Snapchat. Her first feature was the drama Chemical Cut (2016), set in the fashion industry.

In 2017, Safari was featured in the documentary film Soul Trekkers, originally intended to be a television docu-series titled BYOB - Bring Your Own Board, focusing on surfing and including appearances by Junior female surf champion Nikki Viesins, surf coach Bethany Hamilton, Sean Mattison and others.

Safari's appears in swimsuit photoshoots for TMZ and MAXIM. She's been featured in Hollywood Life.

Filmography

References

External links 

Living people
Deal or No Deal
American female models
American actresses
1993 births
21st-century American women